Andrea Bertolacci (born 11 January 1991) is an Italian professional footballer who plays as a midfielder for Turkish club Fatih Karagümrük.

Bertolacci began his career at Roma, and was signed by AC Milan in 2015. Following loans to Genoa and Sampdoria, in 2020 he moved to Turkish side Fatih Karagümrük. Having represented Italy at youth level, he made his debut for the senior national team in November 2014, in a friendly match against Albania.

Club career

Roma 
Bertolacci started his career with the Roma academy.

Loan to Lecce 
In January 2010 he was sent on loan to Serie A team, Lecce. He scored the first goal for Lecce against Juventus a game in which he scored a brace. In summer 2010, Lecce extended the loan and borrowed Simone Sini also from Roma.

On 22 June 2011, Lecce excised the option to purchase 50% of his registration rights for a pre-agreed fee of €500,000. However, Roma excised the rights against the option for €500,000. Thus, Lecce received €500,000 in net as an incentive for the loan. Then Bertolacci was loaned for another season to Lecce, in order to play as a regular and gain more experience.

Bertolacci scored against his parent club in a 2–1 defeat on 20 November 2011. On 30 June 2012, he returned to Roma.

Genoa 
In summer 2012 he was involved in the deal to sign Genoa's Panagiotis Tachtsidis. 50% of Bertolacci's player rights were tagged for €1 million and also 50% of Tachtsidis's rights for €2.5 million.

On 20 June 2014, Roma and Genoa renewed their co-ownership contract agreement with Bertolacci.

The 2014–15 season with Genoa was Bertolacci's best season of his career. He scored 6 goals in 34 matches of Serie A, producing 8 assists and helping his team reaching 6th place in the league.

AC Milan 
In June 2015, Roma bought the other part of Bertolacci's player rights from Genoa for a sum of €8.5m. Subsequently, on 29 June 2015, Bertolacci joined fellow Serie A club AC Milan for €20m.

He scored his first Serie A goal for Milan in a 3–1 away win over Lazio on 1 November 2015.

Sampdoria 
On 8 October 2019, Bertolacci signed for Sampdoria until 30 June 2020.

Fatih Karagümrük 
On 23 December 2020, Bertolacci signed for Süper Lig club Fatih Karagümrük.

Kayserispor 
On 14 January 2022, Bertolacci joined Kayserispor on a two-and-a-half-year. On 3 December 2022, he terminated his contract with the club citing unpaid wages.

Return to Fatih Karagümrük 
On 27 December 2022, Bertolacci re-joined Fatih Karagümrük on a one-and-a-half-year deal.

International career

Youth 
Bertolacci started his international experience in Val-de-Marne under-16 international tournament. He played all 3 matches of the 2008 UEFA European Under-17 Football Championship elite qualification, in which Italy did not qualify to the next round. He was then promoted to the U19 team in January 2009 (as a consequence of the early exit of U-19 born 1990 team), played twice in 2010 UEFA European Under-19 Football Championship elite qualification and once in the elite round. He was also selected for the final stage, playing twice as starter. During the 2010–11 season he was capped twice for the U20 team in the Four Nations Tournament.

In April 2011 he received his first under-21 call-up. However, he was injured and missed the friendly. On 10 August 2011 he made his debut with the Italy U21 team, in a friendly match against Switzerland.

On 11 June 2013, Bertolacci scored a 94th-minute equaliser – his first goal for the under-21s – against Norway in the European U-21 Championships to ensure Italy topped their group. Italy went on to reach the final, though Bertolacci did not feature.

Senior 
On 9 November 2014, he was called up by Antonio Conte to the senior squad ahead of a UEFA Euro 2016 qualifying match against Croatia and a friendly against Albania. On 18 November, he made his debut with senior team against Albania, playing for 70 minutes in a 1–0 win at Stadio Luigi Ferraris. On 28 March 2015, Bertolacci made his second appearance for Italy in a Euro 2016 qualifying match against Bulgaria in Sofia which finished 2–2.

Style of play
Bertolacci is a quick, hardworking, versatile and well-rounded midfielder, who is also capable of playing in several other positions, due to his ability to aid his team both offensively and defensively. A left-footed player, he is usually deployed as a creative attacking midfielder, due to his vision, passing, technique, and striking ability, as well as his adeptness at making attacking runs, although he is also capable of playing as a central midfielder, or as a mezzala.

Personal life
Bertolacci married actress Nicole Murgia on 23 December 2015 and is brother-in-law with her brother, Alessandro, who is also a footballer.

Career statistics

Club

International

Honours
AC Milan
 Supercoppa Italiana: 2016

References

External links
 La Gazzetta dello Sport Profile 
 FIGC 

1991 births
Living people
Footballers from Rome
Italian footballers
Serie A players
Serie B players
Süper Lig players
A.S. Roma players
U.S. Lecce players
Genoa C.F.C. players
A.C. Milan players
U.C. Sampdoria players
Fatih Karagümrük S.K. footballers
Kayserispor footballers
Italy youth international footballers
Italy under-21 international footballers
Association football midfielders
Italy international footballers
Italian expatriate footballers
Expatriate footballers in Turkey
Italian expatriate sportspeople in Turkey